John Duncan Robertson (22 July 1889 – 20 July 1975) was an Australian rules footballer who played with Melbourne in the Victorian Football League (VFL).

Family
The son of John Robertson (1847-1918), and Catherine Robertson (1852-1914), née McNicol, John Duncan Robertson was born at Woolloongabba, Queensland on 22 July 1889.

He married Rubina Isobel Tarrant (1890-1969) on 4 July 1918. They had a daughter, Jean Dorothy Robertson(1920-2019), later Mrs. John Francis Carolane.

Football
He came to the VFL from Port Melbourne Railway United. He started his league career as a wingman, before later playing as a centre. His play has been described as "flashy", on occasion he would hold onto the ball for too long. He made 60 senior appearances for Melbourne, from 1909 to 1913.

Death
He died at Heidelberg, Victoria on 20 July 1975.

Footnotes

References

External links

 
 
 Jack Robertson, at Demonwiki.
 Jack Robertson, at Boyles Football Photos.

1889 births
1975 deaths
Australian rules footballers from Victoria (Australia)
Melbourne Football Club players
Australian rules footballers from Queensland